"Cool as Hell" is a song by Australian musician Baker Boy, released on 25 January 2019 as the lead single from his upcoming debut album Gela (2021).

"Cool as Hell" was certified gold in Australia in 2020, and received nominations for Best Hip Hop Release and Best Video at the 2019 ARIA Music Awards and for Most Performed Urban Work of the Year at the 2020 APRA Awards.

Music video
The music video was directed by Gabriel Gasparinatos and released on 21 February 2018. The video also features Baker Boy dancing with his brother Adam and father Josiah, something that was a "last minute decision" according to Gasparinatos. Gasparinatos said "I wanted to map Danzal's journey and visualise how a young boy from North East Arnhem Land made it onto the world stage. I felt that epitomised the clip's meaning and intention and really brought it home." Baker Boy said "'Cool as Hell' is about letting the music take control of your body and that's exactly what the film clip does too. It makes you feel bright and happy. Just makes you want to feel the music and dance."

Critical reception
Peter Tuskan from The Music Network called it a "musical masterpiece which features funky bass lines and Baker Boy’s never-before-seen vocal range."

Awards and nominations

ARIA Awards

! 
|-
! scope="row" rowspan="2"| 2019
| rowspan="2"| "Cool as Hell"
| Best Hip Hop Release
| rowspan="2" 
| rowspan="2"|  
|-
| Best Video
|}

ARIA Awards

! 
|-
! scope="row"| 2020
| "Cool as Hell"
| Most Performed Urban Work of the Year
| 
| 
|}

Certifications

References

2019 singles
2019 songs
Baker Boy songs
Songs written by Baker Boy
Songs written by Dallas Woods
Songs written by Tuka (rapper)